The men's 3000 metres event  at the 2002 European Athletics Indoor Championships was held on March 2.

Results

References
Results

3000 metres at the European Athletics Indoor Championships
3000